Kalamata Metropolitan Stadium is a sports arena in Kalamata, Messinia, Greece. 

The stadium was completed in 1976, and currently has a seating capacity of 4,496.

The stadium is the home field for Kalamata FC; also, the venue hosts the Papaflessia International Athletics Meeting and the annual Easter festival Saitopolemos.

References

External links
 Kalamata Stadium profile at Stadia.gr

Athletics (track and field) venues in Greece
Football venues in Greece
Sport in Kalamata
Buildings and structures in Messenia
1976 establishments in Greece
Sports venues completed in 1976
Kalamata F.C.